Knox Building may refer to:

Knox Building (Baton Rouge, Louisiana), listed on the National Register of Historic Places in East Baton Rouge Parish, Louisiana
Knox Building (New York, New York), listed on the National Register of Historic Places in New York County, New York